Arcana Project (stylized as ARCANA PROJECT) is a Japanese vocal group. It is co-produced by Dearstage, inc. and Lantis. The group's motif is based on tarot cards, with each member assigned to a tarot card instead of color like other groups.

History

Members
 - The Empress
 - Wheel of Fortune (also a member of Dempagumi.inc}
 - Judgement
 - The Magician
 - The Star

Past member 
 - The World (graduated in March 2021)

Discography

Singles

References

External links
 

Japanese vocal groups

2019 establishments in Japan
Japanese girl groups
Japanese idol groups
Musical groups established in 2019
Lantis (company)